Samuel Irwin Crookes (1871–26 December 1955) was a New Zealand engineering teacher and consultant, local politician. He was born in Sheffield, Yorkshire, England on 1871.

In 1935, he was awarded the King George V Silver Jubilee Medal.

References

1871 births
1955 deaths
Auckland City Councillors
New Zealand educators
English emigrants to New Zealand
People from Sheffield
20th-century New Zealand engineers
20th-century New Zealand politicians